Yegor Timurovich Gaidar (19 March 1956 – 16 December 2009) was a Soviet and Russian economist, politician, and author, and was the Acting Prime Minister of Russia from 15 June 1992 to 14 December 1992.

He was the architect of the controversial shock therapy reforms administered in Russia after the dissolution of the Soviet Union, which brought him both praise and harsh criticism. He participated in the preparation of the Belovezh Accords. Many Russians held him responsible for the economic hardships that plagued the country in the 1990s that resulted in mass poverty and hyperinflation among other things, although liberals praised him as a man who did what had to be done to save the country from complete collapse. Jeffrey Sachs, director of Columbia University's Earth Institute, who advised the Russian government in the early 1990s, called Gaidar "the intellectual leader of many of Russia's political and economic reforms" and "one of the few pivotal actors" of the period.

Gaidar died of pulmonary edema, provoked by myocardial ischemia on 16 December 2009.

Personal life
Gaidar was born in 1956 in Moscow, RSFSR, Soviet Union, the son of Ariadna Bazhova and Pravda military correspondent Timur Gaidar, who fought in the Bay of Pigs Invasion and was a friend of Raúl Castro. His paternal grandfather was Soviet writer Arkady Gaidar and his maternal grandfather was writer Pavel Bazhov. Despite the Turkic-sounding surname, Gaidar was Russian; his grandfather, originally called "Golikov", adopted the name "Gaidar" from the Khakas language as a nom-de-plume.
 
Gaidar married the daughter of writer Arkady Strugatsky during his time at the university. His daughter, Maria Gaidar, was one of the leaders of the Russian democratic opposition. From July 2009 till June 2011 she was Deputy Chair of the Government of Kirov oblast. In 2015 and 2016 she was vice-governor of Odessa Oblast in Ukraine.

Career
Gaidar graduated with honors from the Moscow State University, Faculty of Economics, in 1978 and worked as a researcher in several academic institutes. A long-time member of the Communist Party of the Soviet Union and an editor of the CPSU ideological journal Communist during the perestroika, he joined Boris Yeltsin's camp during Perestroika. In 1991 he quit the Communist Party and was promoted to Yeltsin's government.

While in government, Gaidar advocated free market economic reforms according to the principle of shock therapy. His best-known decision was to abolish price regulation by the state, which immediately resulted in a major increase in prices and amounted to officially authorizing a market economy in Russia. He also cut military procurement and industrial subsidies, and reduced the budget deficit. Gaidar was the First Vice-Premier of the Russian Government and Minister of Economics from 1991 until 1992, and Minister of Finance from February 1992 until April 1992.

He was appointed Acting Prime Minister under President Boris Yeltsin in 1992 from 15 June until 14 December, when the anti-Yeltsin Russian Congress of People's Deputies refused to confirm Gaidar in this position and Viktor Chernomyrdin was eventually chosen as a compromise figure. Gaidar continued to advise the new government. On 18 September 1993, he was again appointed the First Vice-Premier under Chernomyrdin as a deliberate snub to the opposition. He played an active role in the Russian constitutional crisis of 1993.

On 3 October, he famously spoke live on Russian television, then broadcasting from an emergency station near Moscow, as there was fighting going on in the Ostankino complex, calling on Muscovites to gather to defend Yeltsin's government so that Russia would not be "turned into an enormous concentration camp for decades".

In the 1993 Duma elections, in the aftermath of the crisis, Gaidar led the pro-government bloc Russia's Choice and was seen by some as a possible future Prime Minister. However, due to the bloc's failure to win the plurality of votes in the election, Gaidar's role in the government diminished and he finally resigned on 20 January 1994.

During the 1999 NATO bombing of Yugoslavia Yegor Gaidar, Boris Nemtsov and Boris Fyodorov were in Belgrade, Yugoslavia on a mediation mission.

Reforms controversy

Gaidar was often criticized for imposing ruthless reforms in 1992 with little care for their social impact; however, it has to be understood that the country back then was at the brink of a famine. Russia had no currency for buying import goods, at the same time, no-one gave credits as the country was essentially bankrupt. The collapse of the Soviet social system led to serious deterioration in living standards. Millions of Russians were thrown into poverty due to their savings being devalued by massive hyperinflation. Moreover, the privatization and break-up of state assets left over from the Soviet Union, which he played a big part in, led to much of the country's wealth being handed to a small group of powerful business executives, later known as the Russian oligarchs, for much less than what they were worth. The voucher privatization program enabled these few oligarchs to become billionaires specifically by arbitraging the vast difference between old domestic prices for Russian commodities and the prices prevailing on the world market. Because they stashed billions of dollars in Swiss bank accounts rather than investing in the Russian economy, these oligarchs were dubbed "kleptocrats." As society grew to despise these figures and resent the economic and social turmoil caused by the reforms, Gaidar was often held by Russians as one of the men most responsible. On the other hand, the ubiquitous goods deficit of the Soviet years disappeared and it became possible to buy all goods in the shops. Per capita calorie consumption under Gaidar diminished by 3.5% from 2526.88 kCal to 2438.17 kCal.

According to Franklin Foer writing in The Atlantic, however, "when Yegor Gaidar ... asked the United States for help hunting down the billions that the KGB had carted away, the White House refused."

One of Gaidar's most outspoken critics was the Yabloko economist and MP Grigory Yavlinsky, who had proposed since 1990 a 500 Days programme for the transition of the whole USSR to market economic, which was first backed and then dismissed by the government of Nikolai Ryzhkov. Yavlinsky emphasized the differences between his and Gaidar's reforms program, such as the sequencing of privatization vs. liberalization of prices and the applicability of his program to the entire Soviet Union.

Gaidar's supporters contend that although many mistakes were made, he had few choices in the matter and ultimately saved the country both from bankruptcy and from starvation. According to the BBC's Andrei Ostalski, "There were only two solutions—either introduce martial law and severe rationing, or radically liberalize the economy. The first option meant going all the way back to the Stalinist system of mass repression. The second meant a colossal change, a journey—or, rather, a race—through uncharted waters with an unpredictable outcome."

Poisoning case 
In November 2006 Gaidar went to Dublin, Ireland, to present his book Death of the Empire: Lessons for Modern Russia at an academic conference. Shortly after breakfast, a fruit salad and a cup of tea, Gaidar felt sick and returned from the conference hall to his room at the hotel. He was called on the phone to come down and deliver his speech, which Gaidar later recalled as a call that saved his life, as he would surely have died if he had been in his room unattended. After Gaidar had tried to deliver his speech he collapsed in the university hallway and was rushed to a local hospital. His colleague Ekaterina Genieva recalled that "He was lying on the floor unconscious. There was blood coming from his nose; he was vomiting blood. This went on for more than half an hour". Next day he moved from the hospital to the Russian embassy's premises and arranged a transfer to Moscow where doctors familiar with his health status suggested that it looked like he was 'poisoned'.

In an interview published in the FT, Gaidar claimed that it had been an attempted political murder, where "most likely that means that some obvious or hidden adversaries of the Russian authorities stand behind the scenes of this event, those who are interested in further radical deterioration of relations between Russia and the west".

Anatoly Chubais, another Russian reformist official and a former colleague of Gaidar, rejected the possibility of Kremlin involvement in this case, commenting that "Yegor Gaidar was on the verge of death on 24 November. The deadly triangle – Politkovskaya, Litvinenko and Gaidar – would have been very desirable for some people who are seeking an unconstitutional and forceful change of power in Russia."

Irish police opened an official investigation of the case. One of the versions voiced by the Russian opposition leaders and Kremlin supporters suggested that Boris Berezovsky, then a Russian oligarch in exile, may have been behind it. Andrey Illarionov, a former Putin adviser now living in the US, commented that the whole case was staged, and the reason for taking Gaidar to hospital must have been hyperthensia, stress or alcohol.

Death
Gaidar died at the age of 53 in Odintsovo raion, Moscow Oblast, Russia. Gaidar's aide Valery Natarov stated that Gaidar died unexpectedly, early on 16 December 2009, at his Moscow Oblast home while he was working on a book for children.
Gaidar died of pulmonary edema, provoked by myocardial ischemia.
He is survived by his wife, three sons and daughter.

Gaidar was regarded as an object of loathing among ordinary Russians who lost everything during the shock therapy economic reforms.

Exiled Russian oligarch Mikhail Khodorkovsky and convicted fraudster Platon Lebedev expressed their condolences. "He laid the foundation of our economy".

Russian President Dmitry Medvedev has expressed condolences to relatives and friends of Yegor Gaidar. Medvedev called Gaidar a "daring, honest and decisive" economist who "evoked respect among his supporters and opponents." 
"The death of Gaidar is a heavy loss for Russia," says Russian Prime Minister Vladimir Putin. "We have lost a genuine citizen and patriot, a strong spirited person, a talented scientist, writer and expert.... He didn't dodge responsibility and 'took the punch' in the most challenging situations with honor and courage," the statement said.

The White House offered condolences over Gaidar's death.  U.S. National Security Council spokesman Mike Hammer said that, although controversial, Gaidar's legacy formed the foundation of a dynamic market-based economy.

Gaidar Forum
In honor of Yegor Gaidar, each year in mid-January the Russian Presidency holds the Gaidar Forum that attracts the Russian political and business elite, with top European politicians also attending. The Forum is organized the week before the World Economic Forum in Davos and thus also serves to formulate the Russian positions on a variety of topics.

Academic and political positions

Positions held
Director of the Institute for Economy in Transition
Executive Vice-President of the International Democratic Union (Conservative International)
Steering Committee member "Arrabida Meetings" (Portugal)
Member of the Baltic Sea Cooperation Council under the Prime-Minister of Sweden
Member of the Editorial Board of "Vestnik Evropy" (Moscow)
Member of the Advisory Board of the "Acta Oeconomica" (Budapest)
Member of the Advisory Board of the CASE Foundation (Warsaw)
Member of the International Advisory Board of the Moscow School of Management SKOLKOVO (Moscow)

Honorary positions
Honorary Professor, University of California, Berkeley
Terry Sanford Distinguished Lecturer, Duke University
Honorary Academy member of the Ukrainian Academy of Management
Honorary Director, Russia-Ukraine Institute for Personnel and Management

Bibliography
Collapse of an Empire: Lessons for Modern Russia, by Yegor Gaidar, Brookings Institution Press (17 October 2007), .
Russian Reform / International Money (Lionel Robbins Lectures) by Yegor Gaidar and Karl Otto Pöhl (Hardcover – 6 July 1995)
Days of Defeat and Victory (Jackson School Publications in International Studies) by E. T. Gaidar, Yegor Gaidar, Michael McFaul, and Jane Ann Miller (Dec 1999)
State and Evolution: Russia's Search for a Free Market by E. T. Gaidar, Yegor Gaidar, and Jane Ann Miller (Donald R. Ellegood International Publications) Hardcover (Aug 2003) 
The Economics of Russian Transition by Yegor Gaidar (15 August 2002)
Ten Years of Russian Economic Reform by Sergei Vasiliev and Yegor Gaidar (25 March 1999)
Russia: A Long View, by Yegor Gaidar (Author), Antonina W. Bouis (Translator), Anders Aslund (Foreword), The MIT Press (12 October 2012), .

Further reading
 Ostrovsky, Alexander (2011). Глупость или измена? Расследование гибели СССР. (Stupidity or treason? Investigation of the death of the USSR)  М.: Форум, Крымский мост-9Д, 2011. — 864 с. ISBN 978-5-89747-068-6.
 Ostrovsky, Alexander (2014). Расстрел «Белого дома». Чёрный октябрь 1993 (The shooting of the "White House". Black October 1993) — М.: «Книжный мир», 2014. — 640 с. ISBN 978-5-8041-0637-0

See also 
 Leszek Balcerowicz - architect of the shock therapy reforms in Poland.

Notes

References

External links
Yegor Gaidar's home page 
Speech, explaining the underlying reasons for the dissolution of the Soviet Union
Interview in 2000 with Boston radio
Yegor Gaidar – Daily Telegraph obituary

1956 births
2009 deaths
Russian people of Jewish descent.
Acting prime ministers of the Russian Federation
Finance ministers of Russia
Communist Party of the Soviet Union members
Duke University faculty
First convocation members of the State Duma (Russian Federation)
Moscow State University alumni
Soviet economists
20th-century  Russian economists
Economists from Moscow
Respiratory disease deaths in Russia
Deaths from pulmonary edema
Deaths from coronary artery disease
Burials at Novodevichy Cemetery
Union of Right Forces politicians
Democratic Choice of Russia politicians
Russian liberals
Third convocation members of the State Duma (Russian Federation)
Academic staff of the Higher School of Economics
People from Moscow